Hong Kong Stadium is the main sports venue of Hong Kong. Redeveloped from the old Government Stadium, it reopened as Hong Kong Stadium in March 1994. It has a maximum seating capacity of 40,000, including 18,260 at the main level, 3,173 at executive level, 18,510 upper-level seats and 57 seats for wheelchair users.

The stadium is located in Causeway Bay, Hong Kong Island, in valley of Caroline Hill. Most international football matches held in Hong Kong are held at this stadium. It is also the location for the Hong Kong Sevens rugby sevens tournament. Hong Kong Stadium also hosted the Rugby World Cup Sevens twice, in 1997 and 2005.

History
So Kon Po was formerly the burial ground for the 1918 fire at Happy Valley Racecourse. Then the Hong Kong Government moved all the tombs to Aberdeen. The old Government Stadium was a U-shaped constructed by 1953 and had a capacity of 28,000 with partially covered seating.

The old Government Stadium was only partially covered, without sufficient seats or lighting systems. In the 90s, the Royal Hong Kong Jockey Club proposed a reconstruction plan so that Hong Kong can have a world class sports stadium.

In 2008, 39,000 people attended the first Bledisloe Cup rugby union match between Australia and New Zealand. In 2010, 26,210 people attended the second Bledisloe Cup rugby union game at the Hong Kong Stadium.

1994 Re-construction and Wembley International
In the early 1990s, the Government Stadium was reconstructed into a 40,000-seat rectangular stadium. No running track was built due to the restricted land size. This forced the schools to look for alternative venues.

The stadium's management contract was won by Wembley International, a foreign subsidiary of Wembley Stadium, against strong competition, in March 1994.

From the first day there have been serious problems with the pitch. The owners of the stadium, the Urban Council, were disappointed. It came under fire from local football officials, sports promoters and even Manchester United manager Alex Ferguson, who said, before the exhibition match between Manchester United and South China AA on 20 July 1997, "The pitch is cutting up. The surface is just sand-based and the turf doesn't hold well. Injuries can occur."

The government had hoped that the stadium could be used as a music concert venue in order to bring in more rental income. But nearby citizens complained endlessly about 'noise levels', leading to restrictions on noise levels that effectively rendered the stadium unsuitable for concerts. This reduced greatly the income levels of the stadium and the management company, Wembley, ran into financial troubles.

1998 Hong Kong government takeover
Wembley's management tenure at the stadium was abruptly terminated by the Provisional Urban Council (PUC) on 26 May 1998. PUC also asked Urban Services Department (USD) to assume temporary management of the Hong Kong Stadium and has also agreed to USD's proposals to return the entire pitch of the Hong Kong Stadium. The fundamental issue between the parties was the care and maintenance of the stadium pitch, but also a complaint about an unauthorized bungy jump by Canadian Paul G. Boyle.

In the end, the Hong Kong government was judged to have wrongfully terminated the management agreement and had to pay over HK$20million in damages to Wembley Plc.

Hong Kong Stadium is now managed by the Leisure and Cultural Services Department of Hong Kong, after the Urban Council was disbanded.

Football

Hong Kong First Division League
South China and Kitchee had used the sports ground as the home stadium in 2009–10 season.

Starting from 2010–11 season, only South China use the Hong Kong Stadium as their home stadium.

Lunar New Year Cup 
The ground has hosted matches of the Lunar New Year Cup.

Full house 
The first full house official football match (i.e. non-exhibition match) at the Hong Kong Stadium was the 2009 AFC Cup semi-final second leg between South China AA and Kuwait SC. This was added to in the same year by the 2009 East Asian Games football final between Hong Kong U23 and Japan U23. Although there were empty seats in the stadium, all tickets were sold or distributed.

Kitchee vs Manchester City

On 24 July 2019, the Hong Kong Stadium held a club friendly match between Premier League champions Manchester City and Hong Kong Premier League club Kitchee. where Manchester City won 6–1.

Rugby 
On 1 November 2008, the ground became the first stadium outside of Australia or New Zealand to host a Bledisloe Cup test match. New Zealand's All Blacks won the match, defeating Australia's Wallabies 19–14.

On 1 June 2013, the British and Irish Lions and Barbarian F.C. played a rugby union match at the Hong Kong Stadium.

Hong Kong International Cricket Sixes 
The ground has hosted matches of the Hong Kong International Cricket Sixes since 1996 to 1997.

2009 East Asian Games
The stadium was used as the final venue for both the Rugby 7s and Football tournaments of the 2009 East Asian Games. Hong Kong's rugby 7s team and football team both made the final against Japan. The rugby 7s team finished second to Japan. While the football team defeated them in front of over 31,000 spectators, including Donald Tsang, winning the Hong Kong football team's first ever international title.

2013 muddy turf fiasco 
In 2013, during the Barclays Asia Trophy, Sunderland manager Paolo Di Canio described the pitch as "a killer", while Manchester City centre-back Matija Nastasić is injured on the mudheap pitch, although Nastasić's injury was caused by a kick to the ankle according to City manager Manuel Pellegrini, who refused to blame the muddy pitch. Tottenham Hotspur manager André Villas-Boas was also critical of the pitch after Jan Vertonghen, a first-choice Spurs defender, incurred an ankle injury playing on the surface. "If I can be sincere, I would prefer not to play, but this is the reality that we have to face," said the Portuguese on the eve of his side's friendly against South China AA. Manchester United then cancelled their public training session at the stadium on Sunday amid concerns over the playing surface, did not want to further damage the playing surface or risk any injuries to their players, ahead of their exhibition match with Kitchee SC on 29 July.

On 30 July, the director of leisure and cultural services, Betty Fung Ching Suk-yee said returfing the much-criticised Hong Kong Stadium pitch is being considered, after football fans worldwide slammed the sodden, muddy surface during Barclays Asia Trophy matches on 24 and 27 July. South China FC chairman Steven Lo said in an official blog that recent matches have exposed a serious management problem. Chief Executive Leung Chun-ying said he has asked the Home Affairs Bureau and the Leisure and Cultural Services Department for short, medium and long-term remedies.

In 2015, with support from the Jockey Club, the pitch was completely returfed. The existing turf and soil was removed, the irrigation and drainage systems replaced, and new turf laid.

Non-sports events
Jean-Michel Jarre held a concert at the Hong Kong Stadium on 11 March 1994. It was the first event after the re-construction of the Hong Kong Stadium.

Alan Tam held a concert at the Hong Kong Stadium from 22 to 24 April 1994. It was the first local artist held here.

The only time the venue is used for live events is the Extravaganza of China Olympic Gold Medallists celebration show for the Chinese gold medallists.

Bon Jovi played a concert at the stadium on 25 September 1993 during I'll Sleep When I'm Dead Tour. It was their first concert in Hong Kong.

Canadian Paul G. Boyle illegally bungy jumped from the roof of the Hong Kong Stadium on the morning of Friday 24 May 1996. He was not arrested but was given a lifetime ban from all Urban Council facilities.

Future
At the 2013 Policy Address, Chief Executive Leung Chun-ying said once the Kai Tak Stadium is operational in 2019, the Hong Kong Stadium will be turned into a 10,000 capacity district sports arena.

Facilities
Hong Kong Stadium can accommodate 40,000. The spread is as below:
 18,256 at Main level
 18,507 at Upper levels
 3,153 at Executive levels
 57 wheelchair spaces

In addition, there are many refreshment kiosks inside the stadium.

Other use

The stadium was supposed to be a multi purpose entertainment and sports venue, due to its much greater capacity compared to the other popular and over used Hong Kong Coliseum, where nearly all uses are now strictly for popular entertainment. However, its open-air nature has led to noise complaints from residents in tower blocks surrounding the stadium. It has not been allowed to host entertainment events since 1999.

Gallery

See also
Hong Kong Premier League
List of national stadiums

References

External links

Official homepage 
Picture of old Government Stadium and Hong Kong Stadium

Football venues in Hong Kong
Music venues in Hong Kong
Rugby union stadiums in Hong Kong
So Kon Po
National stadiums
AFC Asian Cup stadiums
Multi-purpose stadiums in Hong Kong
1953 establishments in Hong Kong
Sports venues completed in 1953
South China Tigers
World Rugby Sevens Series venues